Claudio Maccone (born 6 February 1948, Torino, Italy) is an Italian SETI astronomer, space scientist and mathematician.

In 2002 he was awarded the "Giordano Bruno Award" by the SETI League, "for his efforts to establish a radio observatory on the far side of the Moon." In 2010 he was appointed Technical Director for Scientific Space exploration by the International Academy of Astronautics. Since 2012, he has chaired the SETI Permanent Committee of the International Academy of Astronautics, succeeding Seth Shostak of the SETI Institute, who held that position from 2002 to 2012. Maccone's two vice-chairs are his fellow Academicians Michael Garrett, Director of Jodrell Bank Centre for Astrophysics and Leonid Gurvits (IJVE).

Career 
He obtained his PhD at the Department of Mathematics of King's College London in 1980. He then joined the Space Systems Group of Aeritalia (later called Alenia Spazio S.p.A. and now Thales Alenia Space Italia S.p.A.) in Turin as a technical expert for the design of artificial satellites, and got involved in the design of space missions. In 2000 he was elected as Co-Vice Chair of the SETI Committee of the IAA. He has published over 100 scientific and technical papers, most of them in "Acta Astronautica." In 2010, Maccone was appointed Technical Director of Scientific Space Missions for the International Academy of Astronautics. In 2012, he became a founding member of the Advisory Council of the Institute for Interstellar Studies.

Books 
His first book was Telecommunications, KLT and Relativity in 1994 and his second book was The Sun as a Gravitational Lens: Proposed Space Missions (proposing FOCAL space telescope) in 1998 (both at IPI Press, USA). Maccone's third book Deep Space Flight and Communications was published by Praxis-Springer in 2009. In September 2012, his fourth book, Mathematical SETI - Statistics, Signal Processing, Space Missions was published.

Honours and awards
 His second book was awarded the "1999 Book Award for the Engineering Sciences" by the International Academy of Astronautics (IAA).
 The central main-belt asteroid 11264 Claudiomaccone, discovered by Nikolai Chernykh at Crimea–Nauchnij, was named in his honor on 2 September 2001.
 In 2002, he was awarded the “Giordano Bruno Award” by the SETI League, "for his efforts to establish a radio observatory on the far side of the Moon.'' The League considered it notable that Maccone was the first Italian to win the award, which is named after Italian monk Giordano Bruno.

References

External links 
 Deep Space Flight and Communications Talk at the SETI Institute, 11/25/2009,  (Retrieved 09/30/2011)
 
  , Stanford University, April 2016
 Claudio Maccone@ ADS

1948 births
20th-century Italian astronomers
Alumni of King's College London
Living people